The 2015–16 Championnat LNA season was the 85th season of the top tier basketball league in Switzerland. The season started on October 4, 2014 and ended on May 23, 2016.

Competition format
All teams played three times against each other for completing 27 games per team. The number of games at home or away are decided by the league table of the previous season. The eight first qualified teams qualified for the playoffs while the two last teams finished the season. There are not any relegations to LNB.

Regular season

Playoffs

Source: LNBA.ch

References

External links 
 

Championnat LNA seasons
Swiss
basketball
basketball